Roman Derlyuk (born October 27, 1986) is a Russian professional ice hockey defenceman. He is currently a free agent having last played for HC Košice of the Slovak Extraliga. He was selected by Florida Panthers in the 6th round (164th overall) of the 2005 NHL Entry Draft.

Playing career
Prior to coming to North America, Derlyuk played six seasons in the Russian major leagues. On June 1, 2011 the Florida Panthers announced that Derlyuk had agreed to a one-year, entry-level deal with the National Hockey League team. In the 2011–12 season, Derlyuk failed to make the Panthers roster and was assigned to American Hockey League affiliate, the San Antonio Rampage for the duration of the campaign.

Derlyuk returned to Russian club, HC Dynamo Moscow the following year. On October 29, 2014, Derlyuk was traded by Dynamo to HC Sochi for cash considerations.

Career statistics

References

External links

1986 births
Living people
Dynamo Balashikha players
HC Dynamo Moscow players
Florida Panthers draft picks
HC Košice players
HC MVD players
HK Neman Grodno players
Russian ice hockey defencemen
Salavat Yulaev Ufa players
San Antonio Rampage players
SKA Saint Petersburg players
HC Sochi players
Torpedo Nizhny Novgorod players
Russian expatriate ice hockey people
Russian expatriate sportspeople in the United States
Expatriate ice hockey players in the United States
Expatriate ice hockey players in Slovakia
Expatriate ice hockey players in Estonia
Expatriate ice hockey players in Belarus
Russian expatriate sportspeople in Belarus
Russian expatriate sportspeople in Slovakia
Russian expatriate sportspeople in Estonia